Benzilylcholine mustard (N-2-chloroethyl-N-methyl 2-aminoethyl benzilate) is a modified version of acetylcholine, so named because after cyclization in solution it forms an iminium derivative that is structurally similar to benzilylcholine. It is well known for being an irreversible antagonist of the muscarinic acetylcholine receptor. It has been used in pharmacological experiments  investigating the relationship between receptor occupancy and response. It was also one of the tools in characterization of the muscarinic acetylcholine receptor.

Mechanism
On the muscarinic acetylcholine receptor, benzilylcholine mustard acts as an alkylating agent at two sites, one site being the acetylcholine recognition site itself, and the other a site that stabilises the receptor in its inactive state. Groups that can be alkylated in this way include thiols, alcohols, imines and carboxylic acids.

References

Alkylating agents
Irreversible antagonists
Muscarinic antagonists
Nitrogen mustards
Organochlorides
Benzilate esters
Chloroethyl compounds